Solidarity for LGBT Human Rights of Korea (SLRK) is an LGBT rights and counselling organization created on September 9, 1997 in Seoul, South Korea. The current representative of the organization is Kwak Yi-kyong. Former representatives of the group were Jeong Yol and Chang Byongkeon.

The group was first created as a students' LGBT club named the University Students' LGBT Human Rights Association (literally Union for University Students' Homosexual Rights), which was later expanded to include comprehensive LGBT's human rights and counseling groups the next years.

On 1 March 2015, the Solidarity for LGBT Human Rights of Korea (literally Solidarity for Homosexual Rights) reorganized to become the Solidarity for LGBT Human Rights of Korea (literally Active Solidarity for Sexual Minority Rights).

See also 
 Human rights in South Korea
 LGBT rights in South Korea

References

External links 
 Solidarity for LGBT Human Rights of Korea 
 twitter of Solidarity for LGBT Human Rights of Korea 
 동성애자인권연대 웹진 너,나,우리 '랑' 
 LGBT 건강 세상 

Society of South Korea
1997 establishments in South Korea
Human rights organizations based in South Korea
Organizations established in 2004
LGBT political advocacy groups in South Korea
Liberalism in South Korea
Progressivism in South Korea
Organizations established in 1997
LGBT organizations in South Korea